Cottonfish Tales is the 1997 debut studio album by Andreas Johnson.

Track listing
"Purple Morning"
"Head of the Family"
"Crush"
"Cruel"
"Trampoline"
"Like a Woman"
"Worth Waiting"
"Forever Needed"
"Seven Days"
"Room Above the Sun"
"Brave Thing"
"Night Stood Still"

Contributors
Andreas Johnson - vocals, guitar
Johan Lindström – guitar, piano, organ, synthesizer, keyboard
Anders Molin – bass
Andreas Dahlbäck – drums, percussion

References

External links

1997 debut albums
Andreas Johnson albums